Giverville is a commune in the Eure department in northern France.

Population

Sights
 The château de Giverville is a castle built in the 18th century. It was the ancestral seat of the noble Norman family "de Giverville".

See also
Communes of the Eure department

References

Communes of Eure